Dhalbhumargh is a village in the Dhalbhumgarh CD block in the Ghatshila subdivision of the East Singhbhum District in the Indian state of Jharkhand.

History
Dhalbhum was first written about when the British Army attacked the Dhalbhum and Ghatsila region in 1767 jointly with Raja of Midnapore, after a previous abortive attempt in 1765. The campaign against Dhalbhum was led by John Fergusson, who launched an attack on Ghatsila from Jambuni, defeating the local king and destroying Narsingarh Fort. The King was taken captive and deported to Midnapur. His nephew Jagannath Dhal was placed on the throne on the condition that he would pay a yearly sum of Rs 55,000 to the British Government. But, Jagannath found it tough to cope with the demands, as a result of which he was replaced by Baikuntha Dhal. This did not deter Jagannath, who attacked King Baikuntha with the help of Rajah of Jhargram and the zamindar of Ghatsila, Raja Jagannath Singh. Finally, he was reinstated on the condition that during the first year of his reign, he would pay tax of Rs 2000, in the second year Rs 3000 and in the third year Rs 4000. In 1800, rent of Rs 4, 267 was fixed, which was to be paid by the Kingdom. In 1845 the region was incorporated into the Singhbhum District. Following this, in accordance with 1848 Regulation Act, Singhbhum District was converted into a non-regulation district under the Governor of Bengal.

In 1766, Raja Jagannath Singh, a zamindar of Dampara of Ghatsila in Dhalbhum, revolted against the enhanced revenue taxes of the British East India Company. This revolt is well known as Chuar revolt, the first revolt against British East India Company in Bengal Presidency.

Geography

Location                                     

Dhalbhumgarh is shown in Palashbani village/ mouza in the map of Dhalbhumgarh CD block in the District Census Handbook, Purbi Singhbhum, Series 21, Part XII A.

Area overview 
The area shown in the map “forms a part of the Chota Nagpur Plateau and is a hilly upland tract”.  The main rivers draining the district are the Subarnarekha and the Kharkai. The area lying between Jamshedpur and Ghatshila is the main industrial mining zone. The rest of the district is primarily agricultural. In the district, as of 2011,  56.9% of the population lives in the rural areas and a high 43.1% lives in the urban areas.

Note: The map alongside presents some of the notable locations in the district. All places marked in the map are linked in the larger full screen map.

Civic administration 
There is a police station at Dhalbhumgarh.

The headquarters of Dhalbhumgarh CD block is located at Dhalbhumgarh village.

Demographics 
According to the 2011 Census of India, Palashbani had a total population of 415, of which 197 (47%) were males and 218 (53%) were females. Population in the age range 0–6 years was 57. The total number of literate persons in Palashbani was 218 (60.89% of the population over 6 years).

(*For language details see Dhalbhumgarh block#Language and religion)

Transport
Dhalbhumgarh Railway Station is managed by South Eastern Railways. National Highway 18 passes through Dhalbhumgarh. The closest airport is at Jamshedpur, but Dhalbhumgarh Airport is planned.

Education 
Kasturba Gandhi Balika Vidyalaya is a Hindi-medium girls only institution established in 2006. It has facilities for teaching from class VI to class XII. The school has a playground, a library with 300 books, and has 7 computers for teaching and learning purposes.

References

External links
Dhalbhum Block, East Singhbhum

Cities and towns in East Singhbhum district